The province of the Riau Islands in Indonesia is divided into regencies which in turn are divided administratively into districts or kecamatan.

The districts of the Riau Islands with the regency it falls into are as follows:

Batam Kota (Batam City), Batam City
Batu Aji (Aji Stone), Batam City
Batu Ampar (Ampar Stone), Batam City
Belakang Padang, Batam City
Bengkong, Batam City
Bintan Pesisir (Coast Bintan), Bintan
Bintan Timur (East Bintan), Bintan
Bintan Utara (North Bintan), Bintan
Bukit Bestari (Bestari Hill), Tanjung Pinang City
Bulang, Batam City
Bunguran Barat (West Bunguran), Natuna
Bunguran Selatan (South Bunguran), Natuna
Bunguran Tengah (Central Bunguran), Natuna
Bunguran Timur (East Bunguran), Natuna
Bunguran Timur Laut (Northeast Bunguran), Natuna
Bunguran Utara (North Bunguran), Natuna
Buru, Karimun
Durai, Karimun
Galang, Batam City
Gunung Kijang (Deer Mountain), Bintan
Jemaja, Anambas Islands Regency
Jemaja Timur (East Jemaja), Anambas Islands Regency
Karimun, Karimun
Kundur, Karimun
Kundur Barat (West Kundur), Karimun
Kundur Utara (North Kundur), Karimun
Lingga, Lingga
Lingga Utara (North Lingga), Lingga
Lubuk Baja, Batam City
Mantang, Bintan
Meral, Karimun
Midai, Natuna
Moro, Karimun
Nongsa, Batam City
Palmatak, Anambas Islands Regency
Pulau Laut (Sea Island), Natuna
Pulau Tiga (Three Island), Natuna
Sagulung, Batam City
Sekupang, Batam City
Senayang, Lingga
Serasan, Natuna
Serasan Timur (East Serasan), Natuna
Seri Kuala Lobam, Bintan
Siantan, Anambas Islands Regency
Siantan Selatan (South Siantan), Anambas Islands Regency
Siantan Timur (East Siantan), Anambas Islands Regency
Singkep, Lingga
Singkep Barat (West Singkep), Lingga
Subi, Natuna
Sungai Beduk (Beduk River), Batam City
Tambelan, Bintan
Tanjung Pinang Barat (West Tanjung Pinang), Tanjung Pinang City
Tanjung Pinang Kota (Tanjung Pinang City), Tanjung Pinang City
Tanjung Pinang Timur (East Tanjung Pinang), Tanjung Pinang City
Tebing (Canyon), Karimun
Teluk Bintan (Bintan Bay), Bintan
Teluk Sebong (Sebong Bay), Bintan

Districts of the Riau Islands
Riau Islands